Truncatellina claustralis is a species of very minute, air-breathing land snail, a terrestrial pulmonate gastropod mollusc, or micromollusc, in the family Truncatellinidae, the vertigo snails and their allies.

Distribution 
Distribution of this species is central-European and southern-European.

 Bulgaria
 Czech Republic
 Poland - critically endangered
 Slovakia
 Ukraine

References

Truncatellinidae
Gastropods described in 1856
Molluscs of Europe